Muhammad Ayub Sabir is a Pakistani writer. 
He has received Sitara e Imtiaz, Iqbal award  and Pride of Performance award from Government of Pakistan for his literary works.

Personal life

Sabir was born in Haripur, Pakistan. He has lived in Abbottabad and currently is living in Islamabad. He received his Master of Arts degree in Urdu language from Peshawar University, Peshawar, Pakistan. He obtained a M.Phil degree on Iqbal studies from Allama Iqbal Open University, Islamabad and PhD in Urdu Language from Punjab University, Lahore. He has three children, Faiza Khan, a daughter, and two sons, Fahd Ayub and Faiq Ayub. His wife Shirin Ayub is a painting artist.

Career
Sabir has researched on Iqbal studies, Urdu language and Islamic Philosophy. He has thirty-two years (1963 to 1995) including sixteen years of teaching of post-graduate level at Government Post Graduate College Abbottabad and Allama Iqbal Open University, Islamabad, Pakistan. He has served as the head of the department of Iqbal Studies at Allama Iqbal Open University, Islamabad from 2006 to 2008 and as chairman of the Department of Urdu at Government Post Graduate College Abbottabad from 1981 to 1986. He has traveled to the United Kingdom for the study and research on Iqbal. He has attended and been invited to many conferences in India.

Publications
 اقبال کی فکری تشکیل: اعتراضات اور تاویلات کا جائزہ Published by National Book Foundation of Pakistan, Islamabad, 2007
 تصّور پاکستان، علامہ اقبال پر اعتراضات کا جائزہ Published by National Book Foundation, Islamabad, 2004
 معترضین اقبال Published by International Urdu Publications, Delhi, 2004.
 اقبال کی شخصیت پہ اعتراضات کا جائزہ Published by Bait u Hikmat, Lahore, Pakistan, 2003.
 اقبال کا اردو کلام : زبان و بیان کے چند مباحث Published by National Language Authority, Islamabad, Pakistan
 پاکستانی شاعری: ایبٹ آباد کے شعرا Published by International Urdu Publications, Delhi, 2000
 اقبال دشمنی ایک مطالہ Published by Jang Publishers, Lahore, Pakistan, 1993. Second edition by Nashriat, 2008.
 اردو کی ابتدا کے بارے میں محققین کے نظریات Published by Sarhad Urdu Academy, Pakistan, 1998.
 انتخاب خطوط غالب Published by Famous Books, Lahore, Pakistan, 1993, Second edition by Bait ul Hikmat 2004.
 ادبستان ہزارہ Published by Bazm-e-Ehl-e-Qalam Hazara, Abbottabad, Pakistan, 1989.
 پاکستان میں اردو کے ترقیاتی ادارے Published by National Language Authority, Islamabad, 1985.
 آزاد کشمیر میں نفاذ اردو'' Published by National Language Authority, Islamabad, Pakistan, 1984.

See also
 List of Pakistani writers
 List of Urdu language writers

References

External links
Allama Iqbal Open University, Islamabad, Pakistan

1940 births
Living people
Iqbal scholars
University of Peshawar alumni
University of the Punjab alumni
People from Haripur District